Anders Erik Gernandt (30 April 1920 – 2 November 2000) was a Swedish officer and horse rider. He competed at the 1956 and 1960 Summer Olympics in the individual and team jumping with the best result of individual 32nd place in 1956.

Career
Gernandt was born on 30 April 1920 in Råneå, Norrbotten County, Sweden, the son of Dr Fredrik Gernandt and his wife Hanny (née Hippe). He was commissioned as an officer in 1942 and became Fänrik in the Swedish cavalry. He was promoted to ryttmästare in 1952 and was promoted to Captain of the Swedish Army Quartermaster Corps in 1953. Gernandt became captain in the reserve in 1965 where he was promoted to Major in 1974.

He later became a liked TV-commentator of equestrian sport, commenting in Sveriges Radio from 1961 to 1991. Gernandt worked as a visitor manager at Sveriges Television (SVT) from 1980 to 1985. He also added the opening and ending comments in Swedish, in the American comedy show Soap.

Personal life
In 1944, he married Lil Renner (born 1922), the daughter of Commander Louis Renner and Lisbeth (née Lilljequist).

Dates of rank
1942 – Second lieutenant
19?? – Lieutenant
1952 – Ryttmästare
1965 – Captain
1974 – Major

Bibliography

References

1920 births
2000 deaths
Swedish Army officers
Olympic equestrians of Sweden
Swedish male equestrians
Equestrians at the 1956 Summer Olympics
Equestrians at the 1960 Summer Olympics
People from Luleå Municipality
Sportspeople from Norrbotten County